Instrodi (Instituto Strohalm de Desenvolvimento Integral) is a branch of the Social Trade Organization (STRO) in Brazil. STRO is an NGO from the Netherlands.

Originally named Strohalm, the foundation seeks the development of sustainable economies in development regions.

Often, sufficient natural resources are available in those regions, as well as talented people. When local development is slowed by supraregional economic factors, STRO tries to stimulate local development by leveraging socio-economic communities.

Initiating barter-like networks and using complementary currencies, local talent and entrepreneurship is strengthened.  To support complementary currencies, STRO has developed internet trading software named Cyclos.

Currently, STRO is running projects in Brazil, Central America, and The Netherlands.

External links
www.socialtrade.org
www.cyclos.org

Non-profit organisations based in Brazil
Local currencies